Bay Terrace, New York may refer to:

 Bay Terrace, Queens, a neighborhood in Queens, New York
 Bay Terrace, Staten Island, a neighborhood in Staten Island, New York
 Bay Terrace (Staten Island Railway station)